On 23 July 2001, Islamabad experienced a record breaking  of rainfall, which was the 24 hours heaviest rainfall in Pakistan during the past 100 years. Continuous downpour lasted for about 10 hours from 0600 to 1600 PST in Islamabad and Rawalpindi, caused the worst ever Flash flood in the local stream called Nulla Lai and its tributaries of Rawalpindi, which not only flood the low-lying areas of the twin cities but swept away the banks of the stream and buildings built in the encroachments. Islamabad's twin city, Rawalpindi experienced  of rain during this event.

Causes
The cloud burst was the result of the sequel of vigorously developed cloud due to the combined effect of well marked westerly trough (Westerly wave), passing over 500hpa with enough supply of moisture from southwest monsoon.

A surface low pressure formed over Hazara and Malakand division between 34-37ºN and 70-75ºE with central pressure less than 996 hpa. There was a gradually accentuating upper air westerly trough at 500 hpa between 40-50ºN and 60-70ºE and there were strong monsoon incursions from the Arabian Sea and the Bay of Bengal while the southwesterly monsoon current from the Arabian Sea showed strong convergence over Islamabad, Rawalpindi District and Hazara and Malakand Divisions and the presence of a strong southeasterly monsoon current from along the foothills of the Himalayas caused the cloudburst over the twin cities of Rawalpindi/Islamabad.

Rainfall recorded by Pakistan Meteorological Department in different locations of Islamabad and Rawalpindi is detailed below.

Aftermath
Pakistan Meteorological Department issued heavy rainfall forecast in its Weather Broadcast Bulletin a day earlier and Flash flood Warning was issued almost 4–5 hours in advance. Due to the continuous heavy downpour, the Nullah Lai and its tributaries over flooded and inundated the nearby houses, bridges and roads.
According to the official figures, at least 10 people died, 800 houses were destroyed and 1,069 houses were damaged in Islamabad. Over all 61 people died of the catastrophe.

See also
Climate of Islamabad
Climate of Rawalpindi
Climate of Pakistan

References

External links
Pakistan Meteorological Department

Geography of Islamabad
Floods in Pakistan
Islamabad Floods, 2010
Islamabad Floods, 2010
2000s in Islamabad